Albert Chapman was a politician.

Albert Chapman may also refer to:

Albert Chapman (Australian footballer)
Albert Chapman of British Gangsters: Faces of the Underworld
Mrs. Albert Chapman, character in One, Two, Buckle My Shoe
Albert Chapman Mineral Collection, see Mineral collecting
Albert Chapman, character in Breakdown

See also
Bert Chapman (disambiguation)